Reasonable time is that amount of time which is fairly necessary, conveniently, to do whatever is required to be done, as soon as circumstances permit.

This phrase is a U.S. legal term that has been a topic of controversy for many years. It is generally used in reference to  performing an action or remitting payment, but this is a very vague term which causes litigation problems in many court cases. Uniform Commercial Code section 2-206(2) requires that acceptance of an offer be made within a "reasonable time" if no time is specified:

European Union law refers in the Charter of Fundamental Rights of the European Union to:
A right to good administration:
Every person has the right to have his or her affairs handled impartially, fairly and within a reasonable time by the institutions, bodies, offices and agencies of the Union (Article 41)
A right to an effective remedy and to a fair trial:
Everyone is entitled to a fair and public hearing within a reasonable time by an independent and impartial tribunal previously established by law (Article 47).
In 1998 the European Court of Justice reduced the fine imposed on German business Baustahlgewebe for breach of the EU competition rules. In 1989 the European Commission had adopted a determination that 14 producers of welded steel mesh had engaged in unlawful restrictions of competition. Baustahlgewebe appealed against the decision on 20 October 1989 but the Court of First Instance did not rule on the case until 6 April 1995, five years and six months later. The Court of Justice held that the case had not been determined within a reasonable time and reduced the ECU 3 million fine by ECU 50,000 (a reduction of 1.67%).

References

American legal terminology